Tag is a 2018 American comedy film directed by Jeff Tomsic (in his feature directorial debut) and written by Rob McKittrick and Mark Steilen. The film is based on a true story that was published in The Wall Street Journal about a group of men, played by Ed Helms, Jake Johnson, Hannibal Buress, Jon Hamm, and Jeremy Renner, who had spent one month a year playing the game of tag since their childhood. Annabelle Wallis, Isla Fisher, Rashida Jones, and Leslie Bibb also star. The film was released June 15, 2018, by Warner Bros. Pictures. It received mixed reviews from critics and has grossed $78 million worldwide, against a production budget of $28 million.

Plot

Hogan "Hoagie" Malloy, Bob Callahan, Randy "Chilli" Cilliano, Kevin Sable and Jerry Pierce have been playing tag since 1983 during the month of May, with Jerry being the only member of the group who has not been tagged. Hoagie recruits Bob, Chilli and Kevin for one last attempt to tag Jerry, telling them that Jerry plans to retire after this year's game because of his upcoming marriage. Rebecca Crosby, a Wall Street Journal reporter doing a piece on Bob, joins them and decides to write an article on the friends. They are also accompanied by Hoagie's wife Anna.

Once in their hometown, they locate Jerry and make an attempt to tag him, but are quickly overwhelmed by Jerry's skill. Jerry introduces his fiancee Susan. While the others express disappointment over not being invited to the wedding despite their close relationship, Jerry claims he knew they would come anyway; they agree to not play the game at any wedding-related events in exchange for invitations to the wedding. Despite this, the group makes several attempts to tag Jerry, but come up short, with one of the attempts leaving Hoagie, Chilli, and Kevin in traps set by Jerry. During the rehearsal dinner, Susan reveals to the guys that she is pregnant.

Defeated, the group try to build a new plan. After finding out Jerry attends Alcoholics Anonymous meetings, the group decide to strike his next meeting, which is on his wedding day. In preparation, they lock every exit and dress up as members of AA. They make their move and almost tag Jerry, but once he finds himself trapped in the church, Jerry retreats to the communion wine storage. He stays there for hours as the guys besiege the room, until Susan comes by, with the wedding just a few hours away. Susan berates Jerry for risking their wedding for a childish game but suddenly appears to have a miscarriage. Jerry comes out to help. Chilli is convinced that it is a ruse, but the situation seems authentic, and Jerry himself also tells them he is not playing around and the two leave.

The guys receive texts that the wedding is postponed due to the potential miscarriage. However, a suspicious Anna sees that the bridesmaids all made similar Instagram posts. With one of the bridesmaids having a crush on Bob, and also having a private profile, Anna creates a fake profile for Bob in order to bait the bridesmaid for the truth. Once they get access, they see a post from the bridesmaid of Susan in her dress, showing that the wedding is still on schedule. Incensed by the trick, the gang decide to crash the wedding. Upon their arrival, Susan confirms the hoax, including the pregnancy. Angry at Jerry for lying, Hoagie decides to tag Jerry at the end of the ceremony after he and Susan kiss. Hoagie charges at Jerry and ends up tackling the pastor to the ground. Hoagie then loses consciousness, which Jerry thinks is a ruse, but Anna confirms that Hoagie's condition is serious and calls for an ambulance.

Everyone meets up at the hospital where Hoagie tells them the truth: he had lied about Jerry quitting after the season because he wanted to reunite with his friends after he recently discovered a tumor on his liver; he was concerned that he might not be alive for the following year and was heartbroken at possibly dying without seeing Jerry finally get tagged. Jerry chooses to swallow his pride and allows Hoagie to tag him. The group starts the game again, running around the hospital as they did as children, and change their rules so Anna and Rebecca can play as well.

Before the credits roll, video clips and a photograph are displayed of the real group of ten men that inspired the film, who continue to play to this day.

Cast

Production
The film is based on a real-life group of friends from Spokane, Washington, known for playing a month-long game of tag every May over a 28-year period, governed by a contract written by Patrick J. Schultheis. The group was profiled in The Wall Street Journal in January 2013, after which they began receiving offers to adapt their story into a film. They sold the rights to their story the next month. It was initially developed with Will Ferrell and Jack Black in mind; however, both eventually left the project.

By March 2016, Ferrell and Black were no longer attached to the project, Jeff Tomsic was set to direct the film, and Ed Helms and Tracy Morgan were cast. In April 2017, Jeremy Renner and Hannibal Buress joined the cast. Morgan then left the project due to scheduling conflict issues. In May, Jake Johnson and Annabelle Wallis were cast. Jon Hamm, Isla Fisher and Rashida Jones were cast in June, with filming due to begin in Atlanta, Georgia, later in the month, specifically on June 23, with casting for extras issued. Leslie Bibb was added to the cast as filming began on June 20.

Principal photography began in June 2017 in Atlanta, Georgia. In July 2017, Jeremy Renner fractured his right elbow and left wrist after falling 20 feet while performing a stunt. He ended up performing the stunt a second time before going to the hospital, and the production team used CGI to remove his casts in post-production.

Reception

Box office
Tag grossed $54.7 million in the United States and Canada, and $23.4 million in other territories, for a total worldwide gross of $78.1 million, against a production budget of $28 million.

In the United States and Canada, Tag was released on June 15, 2018 alongside Incredibles 2, and was projected to gross $12–16 million from 3,382 theaters in its opening weekend. The film made $1.3 million from Thursday night previews, similar to the $1 million made by fellow R-rated comedy Game Night the previous February, and $5.4 million on its first day. It went on to open to $14.9 million, finishing third at the box office, a figure Deadline Hollywood said "isn't bad, isn't good, it's OK" considering its $28 million production cost. It dropped 45% to $8.5 million in its second weekend, finishing fourth, and $5.6 million in its third weekend, finishing sixth.

Critical response
The website's critical consensus reads, "For audiences seeking a dose of high-concept yet undemanding action comedy, Tag might be close enough to it." On Metacritic, the film has a weighted average score of 56 out of 100, based on reviews from 35 critics, indicating "mixed or average reviews". Audiences polled by CinemaScore gave the film an average grade of "B+" on an A+ to F scale, while PostTrak reported filmgoers gave it a 78% overall positive score.

Peter Debruge of Variety magazine wrote: "Tag leaves audiences energized and, dare I say, inspired, having delivered all that outrageousness...in service of what ultimately amounts to a sincere celebration of lasting human connections."
A. O. Scott of The New York Times wrote: "Tag, unlike too many of its recent ilk, at least bothers to be a movie, rather than a television sketch distended to feature length. The performers don't seem to have been shoved in front of the camera and instructed to be funny. They have to work for their laughs, and to find coherence as an ensemble."

Jon Frosch of The Hollywood Reporter called the film "neither bad nor good, but rather, despite its out-there story, almost numbingly ordinary: an easy, breezy action-com that's sometimes amusing but rarely funny, competent rather than inspired."

Home media
Tag was released on digital copy on August 17, 2018, and on DVD and Blu-ray on August 28, 2018.

References

External links
 
 
 

2018 films
2018 directorial debut films
2010s buddy comedy films
2018 black comedy films
American black comedy films
American buddy comedy films
American films about cannabis
Films directed by Jeff Tomsic
Films scored by Germaine Franco
Films about alcoholism
Films about cancer
Films about divorce
Films about friendship
Films about games
Films about journalism
Films about journalists
Films about marriage
Films about weddings
Comedy films based on actual events
Films set in 1983
Films set in 2013
Films set in Colorado
Films set in Portland, Oregon
Films set in Washington (state)
Films shot in Washington (state)
Midlife crisis films
New Line Cinema films
Warner Bros. films
2010s English-language films
2010s American films